Balota may refer to:

 Several villages in Romania:
 Balota, a village in Prunișor Commune, Mehedinți County
 Balota, a village in Racovița Commune, Vâlcea County
 Balota de Jos and Balota de Sus, villages in Murgași Commune, Dolj County
 The Balota, a river in southern Romania, tributary of the Luncavăț
 Balota village in the Taluka of Hansot, Gujarat, India

People

Mate Balota (1898-1963), Croatian poet